Globetrotter or globe trotter may refer to:

 Globe-Trotter, a luggage manufacturer
 Globetrotter 2, a geography education game
 A member of the Harlem Globetrotters basketball team
 Poullin JP.20 Globe Trotter, a French aircraft of the early 1950s
 Le globe-trotter, a 1956 work for piano and later orchestra by Darius Milhaud
 Globe Trotter, a 1989 album by British composer Albert Alan Owen
 "Globe Trotter", a song by American saxophonist Johnny Hodges on his 1955 album Castle Rock
 "Globe Trotter", a track on the 1991 compilation album Images – The Best of Jean Michel Jarre